Louis Feuillard (20 June 1872 - 18 September 1941) was a French professor at the Conservatoire de Paris, a chamber musician and a string quartet cellist.

He was recognized for his instinct of education mainly as a professor of the famous cellist Paul Tortelier. His Exercises journaliers (Daily exercises)  cover the most important aspects of cello technique, such as neck and thumb exercises and bow exercises. It is in particular because of the logical structure of the exercises that they have entered the standard learning of the cello since their publication in 1919.

References

External links 
 Louis Feuillard - Méthode du jeune violoncelliste on La flûte de Pan

French classical cellists
Academic staff of the Conservatoire de Paris
1872 births
1941 deaths